Lichinales is the sole order of ascomycete fungi in the class Lichinomycetes. It contains three families: Gloeoheppiaceae (3 genera), Lichinaceae (43 genera), and Peltulaceae (1 genus). Most species are lichenized. Lichinales was proposed in 1986 by German lichenologists Aino Henssen and Burkhard Büdel. The class Lichinomycetes was created by Valérie Reeb, François Lutzoni and Claude Roux in 2004.

A study published in late 2022 suggests that six classes of fungi, Candelariomycetes, Coniocybomycetes, Geoglossomycetes, Lichinomycetes, Sareomycetes, and Xylonomycetes, are all part of a clade that has a sister relationship with a clade containing Lecanoromycetes and Eurotiomycetes. Lichinomycetes is the oldest name among these orders, and so the authors used this name for the group. Phylogenomic analysis of a 481-genome set showed that as a group, the Lichinomycetes have relatively small genomes, and fewer metabolic gene clusters; one consequence of this is an inability to break down cellulose and pectin. Because of this reduced metabolic capability, Lichinomycetes fungi may have adapted to partner symbiotically with other species to compensate for these losses.

References

Lichinomycetes
Lichen orders
Ascomycota orders
Taxa named by Aino Henssen
Taxa described in 1986